Bruno Santos da Silva, or simply Bruno Santos, (born 31 August 1983, in Rio de Janeiro) is a former Brazilian footballer who played as a striker.

Career 
Bruno Santos played for Swedish side IFK Norrköping between 2003 and 2007. In 2005, he was the top-scorer in Superettan with his 17 goals for Norrköping and he left the club in 2007 after helping to promote the club to Allsvenskan. In total he scored 37 goals for Norrköping between 2003 and 2007.

After spells at Figueirense, Châteauroux, and Ceará on 28 June 2010 he returned to IFK Norrköping, signing a three-and-a-half year contract. In 2012 he joined second tier Ljungskile SK on a season-long loan.

References

1983 births
Living people
Association football forwards
Brazilian footballers
Brazilian expatriate footballers
Figueirense FC players
Expatriate footballers in France
Expatriate footballers in Sweden
IFK Norrköping players
LB Châteauroux players
Ceará Sporting Club players
Ljungskile SK players
Campeonato Brasileiro Série A players
Ligue 2 players
Allsvenskan players
Superettan players
Footballers from Rio de Janeiro (city)